The Papeete Tahiti Temple is the 27th constructed and 25th operating temple of the Church of Jesus Christ of Latter-day Saints (LDS Church).  Located in the city of Papeete on the island of Tahiti in French Polynesia, it was built with a modern single-spire design.

History
The Papeete Tahiti Temple was announced on April 2, 1980, then dedicated on October 27, 1983 by Gordon B. Hinckley.

The temple underwent renovation and was rededicated on November 12, 2006 by apostle L. Tom Perry. An estimated 10,000 Tahitians participated in the rededication, held at the temple and broadcast to local stake centers, downtown Salt Lake City, New Caledonia, and the Brigham Young University–Hawaii campus in Laie, Hawaii.

In 2020, the Papeete Tahiti Temple was closed in response to the coronavirus pandemic.

See also

 Michael F. Moody, a former temple president
 Comparison of temples of The Church of Jesus Christ of Latter-day Saints
 List of temples of The Church of Jesus Christ of Latter-day Saints
 List of temples of The Church of Jesus Christ of Latter-day Saints by geographic region
 Temple architecture (Latter-day Saints)
 The Church of Jesus Christ of Latter-day Saints in French Polynesia

References

External links
Papeete Tahiti Temple Official site
Papeete Tahiti Temple at ChurchofJesusChristTemples.org
  Papeete Tahiti Temple page with interior photos

20th-century Latter Day Saint temples
Papeete
Religious buildings and structures in French Polynesia
Religious buildings and structures completed in 1983
Temples (LDS Church) in Oceania
The Church of Jesus Christ of Latter-day Saints in French Polynesia
1983 establishments in French Polynesia
Religious organizations based in French Polynesia